Arvin Amoakoh Appiah (born 5 January 2001) is an English professional footballer who plays as a winger for Spanish club Málaga CF, on loan from UD Almería.

Club career

Nottingham Forest
Appiah made his professional debut for Nottingham Forest on 30 October 2018, appearing as an 85th-minute substitute and scoring a goal in a 3–2 loss in a fourth round EFL Cup game against Burton Albion.

On 23 January 2019, Appiah penned a four-and-a-half-year contract extension with Forest.

Almería
On 2 September 2019 Appiah signed for Spanish Segunda División side Almería on a five-year deal for an undisclosed fee, reported to be £8 million.

On 1 February 2021, Appiah moved to fellow second division team CD Lugo, on a loan deal until the end of the season. Upon returning, he was mainly a backup option as the Rojiblancos achieved promotion to La Liga as champions.

On 1 September 2022, Appiah was loaned to CD Tenerife in the second level for the season. On 30 December, however, his loan was cut short, and he moved to fellow second tier side Málaga CF on 9 January, also in a temporary deal.

International career
In May 2018, Appiah scored for England U17 against Italy in the group stage of the 2018 UEFA European Under-17 Championship. The hosts were eliminated by the Netherlands at the semi-final stage on a penalty shootout with Appiah successfully converting his spot kick.

In October 2018, Appiah scored for the England U18s against Sweden. In March 2019, Appiah received his first call-up for the England U19s for the 2019 U19 EURO Elite Qualifying Round and made his U19 debut as a 66th minute substitute during the 4–1 win over Czech Republic at St. George's Park

Personal life
Appiah was born in Amsterdam, before moving to Nottingham in England when he was six-years old. Appiah is of Ghanaian descent.

Appiah's older brother Nathaniel is also a footballer. A defender, he came through the ranks at Rochdale.

Career statistics

References

External links

2001 births
Living people
Footballers from Amsterdam
Footballers from Nottingham
English footballers
English expatriate footballers
England youth international footballers
Dutch footballers
English people of Ghanaian descent
Dutch sportspeople of Ghanaian descent
Dutch emigrants to England
Nottingham Forest F.C. players
UD Almería players
UD Almería B players
CD Lugo players
CD Tenerife players
Málaga CF players
Segunda División players
Tercera División players
English Football League players
Association football forwards
Black British sportsmen